The U.S. Army Corps of Engineers Europe District, (NAU) provides both installation and contingency support to U.S. forces throughout the United States European Command area of responsibility. Headquartered in Wiesbaden, Germany, the district, which is part of the North Atlantic Division, covers a widely dispersed geographic area from Western Europe across Eastern Europe, including Russia, down to Israel and throughout most of the African continent. Work is executed from offices in Germany, Belgium, Turkey, Romania, Italy, Spain, Kosovo, Israel, Bulgaria, and Georgia. In 2009, the district completed more than $1.2 billion in projects including $648 million in military construction projects. The bulk of this work included Army and Air Force Family Housing units, forward operating sites in Eastern Europe, and training and operations facilities.

Other new challenges on the district's frontiers included $8.5 million in security and law enforcement projects in Georgia, $6.3 million in humanitarian assistance projects throughout the Caucasus, Balkans and Africa, and a host of other invaluable projects throughout five countries on the African continent.

History
The unit was established in 1971 in Frankfurt am Main.

Nonmilitary construction projects totaled $396 million – a 26 percent increase from 2008 – including almost $200 million in upgrades to various lodging and administrative facilities, airfields, child development centers, warehouses, and utility infrastructure; more than $125 million in small- to medium-sized renovations and planning work for garrison Directorates of Public Works; and roughly $30 million for environmental surveys and services throughout Europe.

Most illustrative of the district's work in 2009, however, was the construction placement. The district turned over 44 major facilities and 100 small- to medium-sized renovation projects, totaling about $586 million to customers this year. These projects included barracks, vehicle maintenance facilities, company operation facilities, and battalion and brigade headquarters facilities in Grafenwoehr, Germany; an Army Lodge in Chièvres Air Base, Belgium; the first C-130J aircraft hangar in Europe at Ramstein Air Base; a consolidated communications facility in Turkey; the only official border crossing station between Georgia and Russia; and miscellaneous military facilities on bases across Europe, Israel and Mali.

Europe District staff also provided rapid response in support of contingency operations, deploying nine percent of all government civilians to support contingency operations in the Middle East, including 11 employees to Operation Iraqi Freedom and 12 employees to Operation Enduring Freedom in Afghanistan.

Also on the district's frontier in 2009 were the continued support to manage the construction of $100 million in forward operating site facilities for the U.S. Army Europe-led Task Force-East initiative in Romania and Bulgaria and another $100 million in projects requested by Israel to help it maintain its qualitative military edge over other countries in the region that threaten its security.

Mission
The United States Army Corps of Engineers Europe District provides planning, design, construction, environmental services, and project management to meet customer infrastructure requirements; engineering services supporting the Theater Security Cooperation Plan; and Field Force Engineering supporting contingency operations in the U.S. European Command and U.S. Africa Command areas of responsibility. 
 
Within its geographic boundaries, NAU supports the following governmental agencies and foreign governments:

Armed Forces
 United States European Command
 United States African Command
 United States Army Europe (USAREUR)
 United States Army Africa (USARAF)
 United States Air Forces in Europe – Air Forces Africa (USAFE-AFAFRICA)
 Seventeenth Air Force
 Special Operations Command, Europe

Department of Defense Agencies
 Department of Defense Dependents Schools
 Defense Commissary Agency
 Defense Logistics Agency
 Army and Air Force Exchange Service
 Defense Intelligence Agency
 United States Army Medical Command
 United States Army Installation Management Command, Europe
 Family and Morale, Welfare and Recreation Command
 Missile Defense Agency

Other governmental agencies
 United States Agency for International Development
 United States Department of Energy
 United States Customs and Border Protection
 United States Department of State
 Supreme Headquarters Allied Powers Europe (SHAPE)
 Bureau of International Narcotics and Law Enforcement Affairs
 Host Nation Governments (Germany, Belgium, etc.)
 Government of Israel (Ministry of Defense)

Programs

1. U.S. Military Construction (MILCON) 
The MILCON programs fund much of the Europe District's engineering and construction program. The programs provide much-needed improvements to both operational and quality-of-life infrastructure. In fiscal year 2010, the district plans to execute about $746 million in support of U.S. forces and other customers throughout Europe. Current major MILCON programs include:

* Task Force – East (TF-E) –

A U.S. Forward Operating Site (FOS) has been built in Romania and is being built Bulgaria. These are basic facilities to support the requirements of rotational training units of about 2,000 U.S. forces and include expeditionary-type billets, operation/administration, and maintenance facilities.

* Army and Air Force Family Housing (AFH/AAFH) –

Since 2003, the district has been executing a large construction program to improve the infrastructure, safety and appearance of both Army and Air Force Family Housing dwellings. Current projects include design and construction of family housing communities at Wiesbaden, Vilseck, and Baumholder and Ansbach, Germany; and Incirlik Air Base, Turkey. The family housing program between fiscal year 2006 and 2009 was roughly $500 million.

* Department of Defense Dependent Schools, Europe (DoDDS-E) –

Currently, the DoDDS-E MILCON program has 7 projects in design worth about $298.7 million and 4 projects in construction worth about 31.8 million – up from the only $15 million in fiscal year 2009. The program is expected to grow to over $1.1 billion through fiscal year 2015. Major projects include Kaiserslautern High School, Böblingen elementary and high schools, and SHAPE elementary, middle, and high school projects. The district is also executing design on replacement facilities for the SHAPE International School.

2. NAU's Installation Support (ISB) Program
ISB offers technical and project management services on a reimbursable basis to supplement installation-engineering capabilities. Among the services available are:

• Project scope development
• Installation and Base Camp Master Planning, including comprehensive master plans, stationing and area development plans, and facility utilization surveys 
• Project programming (DD 1391s) and Planning Charrettes
• Geographic Information Systems, including data collection, GIS map maintenance and conversion, and training
• Project Design, including full design for small projects with Life Cycle Project Management 
• Job order contracts which provide pre-priced maintenance and repair (M&R) work items and delivery orders
• Indefinite-delivery-indefinite-quantity (IDIQ) Multiple Award Task Order (MATOC) contracts; allows flexibility for scope of work, design and funding/task orders.
• Energy Savings Performance Contract (ESPC) 
• USACE Access Control Point Equipment Program (ACPEP)

3. Environmental Support -
The Environmental Team performs tasks like conducting environmental baseline surveys, environmental reviews, identifying and disposing of contaminated materials and soils, providing remediation design, execution and management services, and natural and cultural resource management. The environmental program also supports the U.S. Army garrisons with their environmental operational, remediation, and base closure activities and provides support to 7th Army Joint Military Training Command's Integrated Training Area Management program and the Defense Logistics Agency Energy's program throughout Europe.

4. The U.S. Operations and Maintenance (O&M) –
O&M programs fund about a quarter of Europe District's engineering and construction team. These programs supplement the U.S. Army garrison installation engineers with the total resources, experience and expertise of the U.S. Army Corps of Engineers in their efforts to resolve O&M, and host nation engineering and construction issues. The district has made its services more accessible to the garrison Directorate of Public Works (DPW) customers by collocating Regional Program Managers (RPM) with nine U.S. Army Europe and U.S. Air Forces in Europe Installation Engineers. RPMs provide responsive support – from serving as an adjunct member of the DPW staff to helping coordinate with the district and helping prepare forms to justify major construction projects.

5. Defense Commissary Agency and Army Air Force Exchange Service Projects –
The Europe District provides design and construction services to DeCA and AAFES across Europe. Future commissary construction is planned for the Ramstein, Wiesbaden, Ansbach and Stuttgart communities in Germany. The district recently turned over new commissaries at Chièvres Air Base, Belgium, and Grafenwoehr, Germany.

7. Foreign Military Sales (FMS) –
The Israel Area Office is currently the district's southernmost location with about 25 employees. The district supports the Israeli Air Force, Navy and Army through such projects as the design and construction of hangars, ports, maintenance facilities and military infrastructure. Recently, the Europe District completed the last of dozens of military construction projects originally ordered by the Wye River Memorandum – a $275 million FMS endeavor. One of the most high-profile projects has been the $16 million Military Operations in Urban Terrain site, the largest in the world when constructed in 2007. The district is gearing up to support Israel with a renovation of a port in Haifa and construction of helicopter pads in Ramon Airbase.

8. International Engineering –
The International Engineering Center (IEC) provides design and construction contracting services to U.S. government agencies in Europe and Africa for projects that are outside the above categories. Work ranges from traditional military engineering construction of facilities, roads and bridges, to renovating orphanages and building customs and border crossing stations. Major programs include:

• Exercise-related construction (ERC) – The IEC supports EUCOM's Theater Engagement Plan by coordinating and managing Exercise Related Construction throughout Eastern Europe and Africa 
• Georgia Border Security and Law Enforcement Program – The district supports the Department of Homeland Security with construction of customs and border crossing stations. Primary end users are the Georgia Border Guard and the Georgia Customs Department 
• International Narcotics and Law Enforcement (INL) Program – The IEC continues to assist INL with design and renovation of facilities for the Department of State such as police academies, forensics laboratories and pistol ranges 
• Civil-military operations – The IEC provides contracting services to the EUCOM and AFRICOM civil military operations programs to design and construct basic humanitarian projects, including improving potable water, renovating schools, orphanages, and hospitals, and building wells 
• Counter-Narcotics and Terrorism (CNT) Program – The district is currently working on several CNT projects in Europe worth about $4.1 million 
• Operation Enduring Freedom - Trans Sahara (OEF-TS) – OEF-TS is the U.S. military component of the Trans-Sahara Counter-Terrorism Initiative, a U.S. government program designed to help develop the internal security forces necessary to control borders and combat terrorism and other illegal activity.. AFRICOM executes OEF-TS through a series of military-to-military engagements and exercises designed to strengthen the ability of regional governments to police the large expanses of remote terrain in the trans-Sahara. The IEC has supported projects on several facilities in Mali, Niger, and Chad. The IEC is utilizing the newly awarded Multiple Award Task Order Contract which provides the flexibility and responsiveness required by customers to meet late emerging requirements in a more timely manner.

9. Contingency Support

As North Atlantic Division's forward deployed district, the Europe District is heavily involved with Field Force Engineering (FFE) doctrine development, training and implementation. FFE is the means by which the U.S. Army Corps of Engineers supports maneuver commanders in combat or contingencies.

The district conducts regular training for volunteer FFE staff from both Europe District and other North Atlantic Division districts.

The Europe District continues to support overseas contingency operations in Afghanistan through providing roughly $45 million in design, procurement and reachback support each year.

External links 
 Official Website

References 

United States Army Corps of Engineers
Organisations based in Wiesbaden
1971 establishments in Germany
Military units and formations established in 1971